Darreh Qeshlaq may refer to:
 Darreh Qeshlaq-e Sofla